Gaotang County is a county of northwestern Shandong province, People's Republic of China. It is administered by Liaocheng City.

Administrative divisions
As 2012, this county is divided to 3 subdistricts, 6 towns and 3 townships.
Subdistricts
Yuqiuhu Subdistrict
Huili Subdistrict
Renhe Subdistrict

Towns

Townships
Yangtun Township
Zhaozhaizi Township
Jiangdian Township

Climate

References

External links
  Official homepage

 
Gaotang
Liaocheng